Park Joon-hyung (born 22 December 1973) is a South Korean comedian and radio presenter.

Filmography
Don't be the First One! (Cast Member— JTBC 2020–present)

Awards and nominations

References

1973 births
Living people
South Korean male comedians
South Korean radio presenters
South Korean television presenters
People from Seoul
Inha University alumni